India participated in the 1999 Asian Winter Games held in Kangwon, South Korea,  from January 30 to February 6. India failed to win any medal in the Games.

Nations at the 1999 Asian Winter Games
1999